Mary Margaret Truman Daniel (February 17, 1924 – January 29, 2008) was an American classical soprano, actress, journalist, radio and television personality, writer, and New York socialite. She was the only child of President Harry S. Truman and First Lady Bess Truman. While her father was president during the years 1945 to 1953, Margaret regularly accompanied him on campaign trips, such as the 1948 countrywide whistle-stop campaign lasting several weeks. She also appeared at important White House and political events during those years, being a favorite with the media.

After graduating from George Washington University in 1946, she embarked on a career as a coloratura soprano, beginning with a concert appearance with the Detroit Symphony Orchestra in 1947. She appeared in concerts with orchestras throughout the United States and in recitals throughout the U.S. through 1956. She made recordings for RCA Victor, and made television appearances on programs like What's My Line? and The Bell Telephone Hour.

In 1957, Truman abandoned her singing career to pursue a career as a journalist and radio personality, when she became the co-host of the program Weekday with Mike Wallace. She also wrote articles as an independent journalist, for a variety of publications in the 1960s and 1970s. She later became the successful author of a series of murder mysteries, and a number of works on U.S. First Ladies and First Families, including well-received biographies of her father, President Harry S. Truman and mother Bess Truman.

She was married to journalist Clifton Daniel, managing editor of The New York Times. The couple had four children, and were prominent New York socialites who often hosted events for the New York elite.

Early life
Mary Margaret was born at Delaware Street in Independence, Missouri, on February 17, 1924, and was christened Mary Margaret Truman (for her aunt Mary Jane Truman and maternal grandmother Margaret Gates Wallace), but was called Margaret from early childhood. She attended school in Independence until her father's 1934 election to the United States Senate, after which her education was split between schools in Washington, D.C. and Independence.

In 1942, she matriculated at George Washington University, where she was a member of Pi Beta Phi, and earned a Bachelor of Arts degree in history in 1946. In June 1944, she christened the battleship USS Missouri at Brooklyn Navy Yard, and spoke again in 1986 at the ship's recommissioning. She studied singing with Estelle Liebling, the voice teacher of Beverly Sills, in New York City.

Career

Singing

After classical vocal training, Truman's singing career began with a debut radio recital in March 1947, followed shortly thereafter with her professional concert debut with the Detroit Symphony Orchestra. She sang professionally for the next decade, appearing with major American orchestras and giving several national concert tours. Some of her credits include concert appearances with the Los Angeles Philharmonic at the Hollywood Bowl, the National Symphony Orchestra, the NBC Symphony Orchestra, the Pittsburgh Symphony, the Philadelphia Orchestra, and the Saint Louis Symphony among others. While she never performed in staged operas, she did perform opera arias in concert. Her performances were mainly of both sacred and secular art songs, lieder, and works from the concert soprano repertoire. In 1951 and 1952, RCA Victor issued two albums by Truman, one of classical selections, the other of American art songs. She also made recordings of German lieder for NBC. A 1951 Time Magazine cover featured Truman with a single musical note floating by her head. She performed on stage, radio, and television through 1956.

At the beginning of her career, critical reviews of Truman's singing were positive, polite or diplomatic in tone, with some later reviewers speculating that negative opinions were held back out of deference for her father as a current sitting United States President. This practice was broken in 1950 when Washington Post music critic Paul Hume wrote that Truman was "extremely attractive on the stage... [but] cannot sing very well. She is flat a good deal of the time. And still cannot sing with anything approaching professional finish." The review angered President Truman (who was dealing that same day with the sudden death of his childhood friend and White House Press Secretary Charlie Ross), who wrote to Hume, "Some day I hope to meet you. When that happens you'll need a new nose, a lot of beefsteak for black eyes, and perhaps a supporter below!" Hume wanted to publish the letter, but Washington Post publisher Philip Graham vetoed the idea. However, Hume showed the letter to a number of his colleagues, including Milton Berliner, music critic of the rival Washington Times, which published a story. The Post was then forced to acknowledge the letter, which drew international headlines, becoming a minor scandal for the Truman administration. Reviewers after that felt more free to be honest in their reviews of her performances, with mixed criticism for her singing thereafter.

Acting, radio, and journalism
Truman's professional acting debut occurred April 26, 1951. She co-starred with James Stewart in the "Jackpot" episode of Screen Directors Playhouse on NBC radio. On March 17, 1952, Truman was guest soloist on The Railroad Hour in a presentation of the operetta Sari.

Truman also performed on the NBC Radio program The Big Show. There she met writer Goodman Ace, who gave her advice and pointers; Ace became a lifelong friend, advising Truman even after The Big Show.
She became part of the team of NBC Radio's Weekday show that premiered in 1955, shortly after its Monitor program made its debut. Paired with Mike Wallace, she presented news and interviews aimed at a female listening audience.

She appeared several times as a panelist (and twice as a mystery guest) on the game show What's My Line? and guest-starred more than once on NBC's The Martha Raye Show.

In 1957, she sang and played piano on The Gisele MacKenzie Show

Writing
Truman's full-length biography of her father, published shortly before his 1972 death, was critically acclaimed. She also wrote a personal biography of her mother and histories of the White House and its inhabitants (including first ladies and pets).  Truman published regularly into her eighties.

Novels
From 1980 to 2011, 25 books in the Capital Crimes series of murder mysteries, most set in and around Washington, D.C., were published under Margaret Truman's name.

Professional ghostwriter Donald Bain (1935-2017) acknowledged in the March 14, 2014, issue of Publishers Weekly that he had written "27 novels in the Margaret Truman Capital Crimes series (mostly bylined by Truman, my close collaboratormy name is on only the most recent entries, released after her death)."

In 2000, another ghostwriter, William Harrington, had claimed in a self-written obituary before his apparent suicide that Margaret Truman and others were his clients.

Institutions
She served on the board of directors for the Harry S. Truman Presidential Library and Museum and the Board of Governors of the Roosevelt Institute, and served as a Trustee for her alma mater.

Personal life
On April 21, 1956, Truman married Clifton Daniel, a reporter for  The New York Times and later its managing editor, at Trinity Episcopal Church in Independence; he died in 2000. They had four sons:
 Clifton Truman Daniel (born June 5, 1957), Director of Public Relations for Harry S Truman College.
 William Wallace Daniel (May 19, 1959 – September 4, 2000), a psychiatric social worker and researcher at Columbia University. He died after being struck by a taxicab in New York City.
 Harrison Gates Daniel (born 1963)
 Thomas Washington Daniel (born 1966)

Popular culture
Italian dress designer Micol Fontana – the designer of Margaret Truman's wedding gown – was invited to appear as a mystery guest on the April 15, 1956, episode of TV show What's My Line? in New York City. The Truman/Daniel wedding occurred a few days later on April 21, 1956, in Independence, Missouri.

Later years and death
In later life, Truman lived in her Park Avenue home. She died on January 29, 2008, in Chicago (to which she was relocating to be closer to her son Clifton). She was said to have been suffering from "a simple infection" and had been breathing with the assistance of a respirator. Her ashes and those of her husband were interred in Independence in her parents' burial plot on the grounds of the Truman Library.

Bibliography

Non-fiction

Fiction
The Capital Crimes series:

As of 2021, six further novels in the series had been published under Truman's name as "with Donald Bain" or "with John Land."

References

External links

 trumanlibrary.org

1924 births
2008 deaths
20th-century American actresses
20th-century American historians
20th-century American memoirists
20th-century American musicians
20th-century American novelists
21st-century American novelists
20th-century American women writers
21st-century American women writers
20th-century American biographers
American women biographers
21st-century American biographers
Writers from Independence, Missouri
American book editors
American information and reference writers
American mystery writers
George Washington University alumni
George Washington University trustees
American women novelists
Harry S. Truman
Truman family
Children of presidents of the United States
Children of vice presidents of the United States
Columbian College of Arts and Sciences alumni
Writers from Manhattan
Women mystery writers
Novelists from Missouri
Novelists from New York (state)
People from the Upper East Side
Infectious disease deaths in Illinois